The Tulsa Oilers are a professional indoor football team based in Tulsa, Oklahoma.  A member of the Indoor Football League (IFL), the Oilers are set to begin play in 2023 at BOK Center.  The Oilers are owned by Andy Scurto, owner of the ECHL franchise of the same name.

The Oilers are the third arena/indoor football team to play in Tulsa, following the Tulsa Talons of the af2 and Arena Football League (2000–2011) and the Oklahoma Defenders of the APFL and CPIFL (2012–2014).

History
On July 26, 2022, Andy Scurto, owner of the Tulsa Oilers ECHL hockey team, announced that he had purchased an expansion franchise in the Indoor Football League set to begin play for the 2023 season.  Although several fans had hoped for a return of the Tulsa Talons brand, Scurto stated that his preference was for the team to have an oil-related nickname.

On August 16, the five name-the-team contest finalists were announced, Bison, Crude, Oilers, Tornado and Wildcatters.  The Oilers name, logo and color scheme was announced on September 10.

On September 14, 2022, the Oilers announced that Marvin Jones would serve as the team's first head coach.

Head coaches
Note: Statistics are correct as of the 2022 Indoor Football League season.

Roster

References

External links
 
 Indoor Football League website

Indoor Football League teams
Sports in Tulsa, Oklahoma
American football teams established in 2022
2022 establishments in Oklahoma
American football teams in Oklahoma